dSPACE GmbH (digital signal processing and control engineering), located in Paderborn, Germany (North Rhine-Westphalia), is one of the world's leading providers of tools for developing electronic control units.

dSPACE GmbH has Project Centers in Pfaffenhofen (near Munich), Böblingen (near Stuttgart), and Wolfsburg, and cooperates with the autonomous local dSPACE companies situated in the US, UK, France, Japan, China, Korea and Croatia. Various distributors represent dSPACE in other overseas markets.

Application fields 
dSPACE provides tools for developing, testing and calibrating electronic control units (ECUs) in the automotive, aerospace and medical engineering industries, as well as in industrial automation and mechatronics. In most cases, the process of developing and testing ECUs is based on the five phases of the V-cycle. dSPACE's hardware and software cover four of these five phases, but not the first phase, control design.

Control design 
The control design phase involves developing the control algorithms that will run on an ECU, usually by modeling them graphically. This process can be performed with Simulink, modeling software from MathWorks, and is outside dSPACE's application fields.

Rapid control prototyping (RCP) 
In rapid control prototyping, control algorithms are taken from a mathematical model and implemented as a real-time application so that the control strategies can be tested with the actual controlled system, such as a car or a robot. Simulink is used as the input and simulation tool, and Simulink Coder, also from MathWorks, is used as the code generator. dSPACE provides the necessary hardware platform consisting of a processor and interfaces for sensors and actuators, plus the Simulink blocks needed to integrate the interfaces into the Simulink model (Real-Time Interface, RTI).

Production code generation / ECU autocoding 
In a development process based on mathematical models, the models are designed with graphical software, and then automatic production code generators are used to translate the models directly into code for ECUs/controllers. When a model's behavior has been validated, the code generator has to reliably transfer it to the target processor, whose resources are usually designed for the greatest possible cost-efficiency. In other words, the final production ECU generally has less memory and processing power than the RCP system on which the algorithm was developed and tested. As a result, the C code (production code) generated for the target processor has to meet stringent requirements regarding execution time and efficiency. Since 1999, dSPACE markets its production code generator TargetLink, which is integrated into Simulink, the environment for model-based development. In addition to performing the actual autocoding, including code generation for AUTOSAR software components, TargetLink also makes it possible for developers to compare the behavior of the generated code with that of the original Simulink model (by means of software-in-the-loop (SIL) and processor-in-the-loop (PIL) simulation).

Hardware-in-the-Loop (HIL)-Simulation 

In HIL simulation, a simulator mimics the environment in which an ECU will function: a car, an airplane, a robot, etc. First the ECU's inputs and outputs are connected to the simulator's inputs and outputs. In the next step, the simulator executes a real-time model of the ECU's working environment, which can consist of Automotive Simulation Models (ASMs) from dSPACE or of models from other vendors. This method provides a way to test new functions reproducibly in a safe environment, before a prototype of the product has even been produced. As with rapid control prototyping, Simulink models are the foundation.
The advantage of HIL simulation in comparison with ECU tests in real prototype vehicles is that the tests on the control unit can be performed already during the development process. Errors are detected and eliminated very early and cost-efficiently.

Calibration / parameterization 
Optimizing the control functions so that they fit specific applications is an integral part of ECU and controller development. To achieve this, the parameters of the ECUs are adjusted during ECU calibration. dSPACE offers software and hardware for this task.

Company history 
 
 1988: dSPACE is founded by Herbert Hanselmann and three other research associates at the Institute of Mechatronics at the University of Paderborn, Germany.
 1991: First local dSPACE company outside Germany opens (dSPACE Inc.) Initially outside Detroit USA in Southfield, Michigan, relocated to Wixom in 2007.
 2001: Local dSPACE companies are opened in France (dSPACE SARL, Paris) and the UK (dSPACE Ltd., Cambridge); and a second Project Center is opened (near Stuttgart)
 2006: The local dSPACE company in Japan is opened (dSPACE K.K.). Initially in Yokohama, relocated to Tokyo in 2007. 
 2008: The company's 20th anniversary. The local dSPACE company in China (dSPACE Mechatronic Control Technology (Shanghai) Co., Ltd.) is founded, and Herbert Hanselmann receives the "Entrepreneur Of The Year 2008" award
 2010: dSPACE GmbH relocates to the new campus in Paderborn, Germany.
2018: The local dSPACE company in Croatia is opened (dSPACE Engineering d.o.o.) in Zagreb.
2021: The local dSPACE company in South Korea is opened (dSPACE Korea Co. Ltd.) in Seoul.

History of dSPACE products 
 1988: First real-time development system for control technology/mechatronics, based on a digital signal processor
 1989: First hardware-in-the-loop (HIL) simulator is shipped
 1990: First real-time development system with a floating-point processor is shipped
 1992: RTI, first real-time system connected to MATLAB/Simulink
 1994: First multiprocessor hardware for real-time development systems
 1995: First turnkey (HIL) simulator for an ABS/ESP test bench
 1999: MicroAutoBox, a complete prototyping system for in-vehicle use
 1999: TargetLink, the first production code generator for ECUs based on MATLAB/Simulink
 2003: CalDesk, a component of the dSPACE calibration system
 2005: RapidPro, a modular system for signal conditioning and power stages
 2005: Automotive Simulation Models (ASMs), real-time automotive simulation models based on MATLAB/Simulink
 2007: SystemDesk, tool for developing complex ECU software architectures based on the AUTOSAR concept
 2010: MicroAutoBox II, second generation of the vehicle-capable prototyping systems
 2011: SCALEXIO, the new hardware-in-the-loop system, including new ConfigurationDesk configuration software
 2012: VEOS, PC-based simulation platform for early validation of ECU software
 2015: MicroLabBox: Compact prototyping unit for the laboratory

External links

References 

Software companies of Germany
Electronics companies of Germany
Paderborn